Robert Browne (28 February 1602 – 16 May 1634) was an English politician who sat in the House of Commons in 1624.

Browne was the son of Sir Robert Browne of Frampton, Dorset. In 1624, he was elected Member of Parliament for Bridport.

References

17th-century births
Year of death missing
English MPs 1624–1625
Alumni of Magdalen College, Oxford
Members of the Middle Temple
People from Bridport